Eubotrys is a genus of plants in the family Ericaceae. Currently accepted species include:

Eubotrys racemosa Nutt.
Eubotrys recurva (Buckley) Britton

References

External links

Vaccinioideae
Ericaceae genera